Cortez Lake is located in Cortez Park in northwest Phoenix, Arizona, United States, at the northeast corner of 35th Avenue and Dunlap Avenue.

Fish species
Rainbow trout
Largemouth bass
Sunfish
Catfish (channel)
Carp

External links
Arizona fishing locations map
Arizona boating locations facilities map

References

Geography of Phoenix, Arizona
Reservoirs in Arizona
Reservoirs in Maricopa County, Arizona